The Five Martyrs of the Lycée Buffon were five students from the Lycée Buffon shot by the Germans in Paris at the Stand de tir de Balard on 8 February 1943 for their activities with the French Resistance. Also, their families were taken hostage. Following the war, each of the students was posthumously awarded the Legion of Honour, the Croix de guerre 1939–1945 and the Resistance medal.

Commemorations
 There is a Place des cinq martyrs du lycée Buffon in the 14th arrondissement of Paris
 a rue Jacques-Baudry in 15th arrondissement of Paris
 a plaque at lycée Buffon,
 in 1959, La Poste commemorated them with a stamp in the Heroes of the Resistance series
 a rue Lucien Legros in Mont-de-Marsan

See also
 Francs-tireurs et partisans
 Special Sections
 Costa Gavras's film Section spéciale

Notes and sources

Notes

Sources

External links
 The family archives of Pierre Benoît
  Les chemins de la mémoire
 History of the stand de tir de Balard 

French Resistance members
Recipients of the Croix de Guerre 1939–1945 (France)
Recipients of the Resistance Medal
Officiers of the Légion d'honneur
Lycée Buffon alumni
1943 deaths
Resistance members killed by Nazi Germany